Caecomyces is a genus of fungi in the family Neocallimastigaceae.

References

External links

Neocallimastigomycota
Fungus genera